Hrabal is a surname. Notable people with the surname include:

Bohumil Hrabal (1914–1997), Czech writer 
Jaroslav Hrabal (born 1974), Slovak retired footballer
Josef Hrabal (born 1985), Czech ice hockey player

See also
 
4112 Hrabal, a minor planet

Czech-language surnames